"This Old Heart of Mine (Is Weak for You)" is a Holland–Dozier–Holland song that was a hit for American musical group the Isley Brothers in January 1966 during their brief tenure on Motown's Tamla label. Featuring Ronald Isley on lead vocal, "This Old Heart of Mine" peaked at number twelve on the Billboard Hot 100, and at number six on the Billboard R&B Singles chart.

In the UK, the song originally reached number 47 in April 1966, but it re-charted in late 1968 and reached number three for two weeks in November, making it the group's highest charting UK single.

Written by Motown's main songwriting team Holland–Dozier–Holland alongside Sylvia Moy, "This Old Heart of Mine", produced by Brian Holland and Lamont Dozier, was originally intended for The Supremes (who later recorded their own version for their 1966 album The Supremes A' Go-Go).  The single was the group's only major hit while on Motown, whom they left in 1969 to restart their own T-Neck label.

Tammi Terrell also recorded and released the song as a part of her Irresistible album released in January, 1969.

The song was prominently featured in an episode of the hit 1980s show Moonlighting and was one of the tunes included on the show's hit soundtrack.

Personnel
Lead vocals by Ronald Isley
Background vocals by O'Kelly Isley Jr. and Rudolph Isley
Additional background vocals by The Andantes: Jackie Hicks, Marlene Barrow and Louvain Demps
Written by Holland–Dozier–Holland and Sylvia Moy
Produced by Brian Holland and Lamont Dozier
Instrumentation by The Funk Brothers
Baritone saxophone by Mike Terry

Certifications

Rod Stewart versions

In 1975, English singer Rod Stewart released a remake of this song that charted in several markets. In 1989, he released another version—this time a duet of the song with Ronald Isley that reached number two on Canada's RPM Top Singles chart, number 10 on the US Billboard Hot 100, number one on the Adult Contemporary charts of both Billboard and RPM. The later version was produced by Bernard Edwards and Trevor Horn and was released on Warner Records.

Record World said that Stewart's version "[remains] faithful to the
original, yet [adds] enough rasp and thrust to call it all his own."

Charts

1975 solo version

1989 version with Ronald Isley
Weekly charts

Year-end charts

References

1965 songs
1966 singles
1976 singles
1989 singles
1992 singles
The Isley Brothers songs
Rod Stewart songs
Tammi Terrell songs
Luv' songs
Male vocal duets
Tamla Records singles
Riva Records singles
Warner Records singles
Songs written by Holland–Dozier–Holland
Songs written by Sylvia Moy
Song recordings produced by Brian Holland
Song recordings produced by Lamont Dozier
Song recordings produced by Tom Dowd
Song recordings produced by Trevor Horn
Song recordings produced by Bernard Edwards